Kusheh-ye Olya may refer to:
 Kusheh-ye Olya, Sistan and Baluchestan
 Gusheh-ye Olya, South Khorasan